For the 1971 Vuelta a España, the field consisted of 110 riders; 68 finished the race.

By rider

By nationality

References

1971 Vuelta a España
1971